Monodontium is a genus of brushed trapdoor spiders first described by Władysław Kulczyński in 1908.

Species
 it contains five species:
Monodontium bukittimah Raven, 2008 – Singapore
Monodontium malkini Raven, 2008 – New Guinea
Monodontium mutabile Kulczyński, 1908 (type) – New Guinea
Monodontium sarawak Raven, 2008 – Borneo
Monodontium tetrathela Kulczyński, 1908 – New Guinea

References

Barychelidae
Mygalomorphae genera
Spiders of Asia